The Great Challenge was a Chinese variety show that aired between 2015 and 2016. It is a remake of the Korean show Infinite Challenge.

Members

Current members
 Tim Le
 Sa Beining
 Sha Yi
 Ethan Juan
 Negmat Rahman (Episode 3-12)
 Yue Yunpeng

Former members
 Hu Qiaohua (Episode 1-2)

List of episodes

References

External links
 

2015 Chinese television series debuts
2000s Chinese television series
Chinese-language television shows
Chinese variety television shows
Chinese television series based on South Korean television series
Infinite Challenge
China Central Television original programming